The 2021–22 Wofford Terriers men's basketball team represented Wofford College in the 2021–22 NCAA Division I men's basketball season. The Terriers, led by third-year head coach Jay McAuley, played their home games at Jerry Richardson Indoor Stadium in Spartanburg, South Carolina as a member of the Southern Conference. They finished the season 19–13, 10–8 in SoCon play to finish in a tie for third place. As the No. 4 seed in the SoCon tournament, they defeated VMI in the quarterfinals before losing to Chattanooga in the semifinals.

Previous season
In a season limited due to the ongoing COVID-19 pandemic, the Terriers finished the 2020–21 season 15–9, 12–5 in SoCon play to finish in second place. They were upset by Mercer in the quarterfinals of the SoCon tournament.

Roster

Schedule and results

|-
!colspan=12 style=| Non-conference regular season

|-
!colspan=9 style=| SoCon regular season

|-
!colspan=12 style=| SoCon tournament

|-
!colspan=12 style=| The Basketball Classic

Source

References

Wofford Terriers men's basketball seasons
Wofford Terriers
Wofford Terriers men's basketball
Wofford Terriers men's basketball
Wofford Terriers